Brunne is a surname. Notable people with the surname include:

 John Brunne (died 1405), British MP
 Eva Brunne (born 1954), Swedish Lutheran bishop

See also
 Brunn (surname)